Paulo Lima Amaral (18 October 1923 – 1 May 2008) was a Brazilian footballer and coach. He is most famous for his time as a coach of Juventus of Italy. He was also a Fitness Coach of the Brazilian 1958 FIFA World Cup-winning team.

References

External links
 Brazilian FA Database 

1923 births
2008 deaths
Footballers from Rio de Janeiro (city)
Brazilian footballers
Brazilian football chairmen and investors
Brazilian football managers
Serie A managers
Campeonato Brasileiro Série A managers
CR Flamengo footballers
Botafogo de Futebol e Regatas players
Botafogo de Futebol e Regatas managers
CR Vasco da Gama managers
Juventus F.C. managers
Sport Club Corinthians Paulista managers
Genoa C.F.C. managers
Clube Atlético Mineiro managers
Esporte Clube Bahia managers
Fluminense FC managers
FC Porto managers
Paraguay national football team managers
America Football Club (RJ) managers
Al Hilal SFC managers
Clube do Remo managers
Guarani FC managers
Association football midfielders
Brazilian expatriate football managers
Brazilian expatriate sportspeople in Paraguay
Brazilian expatriate sportspeople in Saudi Arabia
Brazilian expatriate sportspeople in Italy
Expatriate football managers in Paraguay
Expatriate football managers in Italy
Expatriate football managers in Saudi Arabia